PSKPS stand for Persatuan Sepakbola Kota Padang Sidempuan (en: Football Association of Padang Sidempuan City). PSKPS Padang Sidempuan is an Indonesian football club based in Padang Sidempuan, North Sumatra.

Former players
 Peter Moukouri Kuoh
 Moussa Keita

References

External links
PSKPS Padang Sidempuan at Liga-Indonesia.co.id

Football clubs in Indonesia
Football clubs in North Sumatra